Henry Pinckney Northrop (May 5, 1842 – June 7, 1916) was an American prelate of the Roman Catholic Church. He served as vicar apostolic of North Carolina (1882-1888) and bishop of the Diocese of Charleston in South Carolina (1883-1916).

Biography

Early life 
Henry Northrop was born on May 5, 1842, in Charleston, South Carolina, to Claudian Byrd and Hannah Eliza (née Anderson) Northrop. He received his early education at Georgetown College in Washington, D.C. from 1853 to 1856. He then studied at Mount St. Mary's College in Emmitsburg, Maryland, graduating in 1860. He attended the theological seminary at St. Mary's for four years before continuing his studies at the Pontifical North American College in Rome.

Priesthood 
Northrop was ordained to the priesthood in Rome by Patriarch Pietro de Villanova Castellacci for the Diocese of Charleston on June 25, 1865.Following his return to the United States, he served as a curate at the Nativity Parish in New York City.  In 1866, he returned to Charleston and became a curate at St. Joseph's Parish. Northrop served as a missionary in New Bern, North Carolina (1868-1872), assistant rector of St. John's Cathedral in Charleston and pastor of the parish in Sullivan's Island, South Carolina (1872-1877), and pastor of St. Patrick's Parish in Charleston (1877-1882).

Vicar Apostolic of North Carolina 
On September 16, 1881, Northrop was appointed the second vicar apostolic of North Carolina and titular bishop of Rosalia by Pope Leo XIII. He received his episcopal consecration on January 8, 1882, at the Baltimore Cathedral from Cardinal James Gibbons, with Bishops John Keane and Thomas Becker serving as co-consecrators.

Bishop of Charleston 
In addition to his duties as vicar apostolic, Northrup was named the fourth bishop of the Diocese of Charleston on January 27, 1883 by Leo XIII. Northrup resigned his post as vicar apostolic on February 4, 1888, while remaining bishop of Charleston. Henry Northrop died in Charleston on June 7, 1916, at the age of 74.

References

1842 births
1916 deaths
Georgetown University alumni
Mount St. Mary's University alumni
Roman Catholic bishops of Charleston
19th-century Roman Catholic bishops in the United States
20th-century Roman Catholic bishops in the United States
Roman Catholic Diocese of Raleigh
People from New Bern, North Carolina
Religious leaders from North Carolina
People from Sullivan's Island, South Carolina
Catholics from North Carolina